Bettina Soriat (born 16 March 1967, Linz) is an Austrian singer.

Bettina Soriat is a singer, dancer, actress, comedian, and choreographer. Her first success came with the girlgroup "Three Girl Madhouse" and their single-hit "Always gonna be around you" was released in 1990.

Appearances
Bettina has appeared in musicals in Vienna, including: 
"Robin Hood" (1991)
"Rocky Horror Picture Show" (1993)
"Sweet Charity" (1994)
"Grease" (1995)
"Blondel" (1996)

As a long-time member of the Kim-Duddy-TV-Ballet, Bettina also appeared in shows like: 
"Willkommen im Club" (1991) (Welcome in the Club)
"Nix is fix" (1993/94)
"Die Peter Alexander Show" (1995).

In 1997 she was Austria's Song Contest-representative with the song "One Step". The song wasn't a great success, placing 21st in a field of 25. Despite having an English title, the song is primarily in German.

In the previous year she sang back-up vocals for Austria's George Nussbaumer at the same contest.  She was married to Michael Niavarani and is a member of the Simpl Revue since 1999.  They currently have one child together.

References

External links

"One Step" lyrics (with English translation)

Eurovision Song Contest entrants for Austria
Eurovision Song Contest entrants of 1997
1967 births
Living people
Musicians from Linz